Emily of New Moon is a Canadian television series, which aired on CBC Television from 1998 to 2000. The series originally aired in the United States on the Cookie Jar Toons block on This TV and it is currently broadcast in Canada on the Viva, Bravo! and Vision TV cable channels. The series, produced by Salter Street Films, was based on the Emily of New Moon series of novels by Lucy Maud Montgomery. The series consisted of three seasons of thirteen episodes and one season of seven episodes, for a total of forty-six episodes produced. The executive producers were Micheline Charest, Michael Donovan, and Ronald Weinberg.

Series overview
The series starred Martha MacIsaac as the titular orphan Emily Starr. Susan Clark and Sheila McCarthy played Emily's aunts Elizabeth and Laura, who had taken on the responsibility of raising Emily following her father's death, and Stephen McHattie played her cousin Jimmy. Susan Clark left the series after the first season when her character, Elizabeth, was killed off.

Recurring cast included Chip Chuipka as Mr. Carpenter, Peter Donaldson as Ian Bowles, Richard Donat as Dr. Burnley, Kris Lemche as Perry Miller, John Neville as Uncle Malcolm, Jessica Pellerin as Ilse Burnley, Shawn Roberts as Teddy Kent, and Linda Thorson as Cousin Isabel.

Guest stars included Janet Wright, Phyllis Diller, Martha Burns, Maury Chaykin, Martha Henry, Lisa Houle, William Hutt, Michael Moriarty, Barbara Feldon, Macha Grenon and Claire Rankin.

Plot
This is the story of a young orphan girl named Emily Starr who is sent to live at New Moon Farm on Prince Edward Island with her aunts Elizabeth and Laura Murray and her Cousin Jimmy after her father dies of tuberculosis. She makes friends with Ilse Burnley, Teddy Kent, and Perry Miller, the hired boy, who Aunt Elizabeth looks down upon because he was born in 'Stovepipe Town', a poorer district.

Each of the children has a special gift. Emily was born to be a writer, Teddy is a gifted artist, Ilse is a talented elocutionist, and Perry has the makings of a great politician. They also each have a few problems with their families. Emily has a hard time getting along with Aunt Elizabeth, who does not understand her need to write. Ilse's father, Dr. Burnley, ignores Ilse most of the time because of a dreadful secret concerning Ilse's mother. Teddy's mother is jealous of her son's talents and friends, fearing that his love for them will eclipse his love for her; as a result, she hates Emily, Teddy's drawings, and even his pets.  Perry is not as well off as the other three, so his Aunt Tom once tries to make Emily promise to marry Perry when they grow up, threatening that unless Emily does so, she will not pay for Perry's schooling.

Other unforgettable characters are Dean "Jarback" Priest, a quiet, mysterious cynic who wants something he fears is ever unattainable; fiery Mr Carpenter, the crusty old schoolteacher who is Emily's mentor and honest critic when it comes to evaluating her stories and poems; "simple" Cousin Jimmy, who recites his poetry when the spirit moves him; Aunt Laura, who is the kind aunt; and strict, suspicious Aunt Elizabeth who yet proves to be an unexpected ally in times of trouble.

Cast

Main Cast
 Martha MacIsaac as Emily Byrd Starr
 Stephen McHattie as Cousin Jimmy Murray
 Sheila McCarthy as Aunt Laura Murray
 Susan Clark as Aunt Elizabeth Murray (main season 1; guest star seasons 2-3)
 Linda Thorson as Cousin Isabel Murray (season 2-3)
 John Neville as Uncle Malcolm Murray (season 2-3)
 Jessica Pellerin as Ilse Burnley (main season 4; recurring seasons 1-3)

Recurring Cast
 Shawn Roberts as Teddy Kent
 Kris Lemche as Perry Miller
 Chip Chuipka as Mr. Francis Carpenter
 Peter Donaldson as Ian Bowles
 Richard Donat as Dr. Allan Burnley
 Marlene O'Brien as Mrs. Velma Stuart
 Emily Cara Cook as Rhoda Stuart
 Carroll Godsman as Mildred Kent
 Aaron Ashmore as Harrison Bowles

Guest Cast
 Michael Moriarty as Douglas Starr
 Janet Wright as Aunt Thom
 Phyllis Diller as Great Aunt Nancy Priest
 Martha Burns as Eve Kinch
 Maury Chaykin as Lofty John
 Martha Henry as Megan Moore
 Lisa Houle as Eve Kinch/Dr. Iris Campbell/Iris Burnley
 William Hutt as Reverend Pitch/Satan
 Barbara Feldon as Madame Marlena
 Macha Grenon as Nadine
 Claire Rankin as Juliet Starr
 Ken Leckey as Officer Finchley
 Sarah Briand as Young Emily
 Peter Levi as Wowkiss
 William Greenblatt as Duncan McHugh

Production
The series was developed by Marlene Matthews, who also wrote or co-wrote nineteen episodes of the series and served as one of the producers for the first three years. 

Additional writers include Nobu Adilman, Leila Basen, Chris Bould, Heather Conkie, Edwina Follows, Dennis Foon, Rob Forsyth, Jeremy Hole, Janet MacLean, Peter Meech, David Preston, Lynn Turner, and Joe Wiesenfeld. Episodes were directed by George Bloomfield, Randy Bradshaw, Richard Ciupka, Phil Comeau, Steve Danyluk, Douglas Jackson, Jimmy Kaufman, Michael Kennedy, Gordon Langevin, Lorette Leblanc, Eleanore Lindo, Don McBrearty, Stephen McHattie, Matthew Nodella, Gabriel Pelletier, Jean-François Pouliot, Stefan Scaini, Mark Sobel, and Giles Walker.

Episodes

Season 1 (1998)
 "Eye of Heaven" (January 4, 1998)
 "Storms of the Heart" (January 11, 1998)
 "The Book of Yesterday" (January 18, 1998)
 "The Disappointed House" (January 25, 1998)
 "Paradise Lost" (February 1, 1998)
 'The Enchanted Doll" (March 8, 1998)
 "Falling Angels" (March 15, 1998)
 "The Tale of Duncan McHugh" (March 22, 1998)
 "The Wild Rover" (March 29, 1998)
 "The Ghost of Whyther Grange" (April 5, 1998)
 "A Child Shall Lead Them" (April 12, 1998)
 "A Winter's Tale" (April 12, 1998)
 "The Sound of Silence" (April 19, 1998)

Season 2 (1998–99)
 "Summer of Sorrows" (October 4, 1998)
 "And So They Shall Reap" (October 11, 1998)
 "A Shadow in His Dream" (October 18, 1998)
 "Where Angels Fear to Tread" (October 25, 1998)
 "The Curse of the Poppet" (November 8, 1998)
 "By the Rivers of Babylon" (November 15, 1998)
 "A Time to Heal" (November 29, 1998)
 "The Devil's Punchbowl" (December 6, 1998)
 "Pins and Needles, Needles and Pins, When a Man Gets Married, His Trouble Begins" (December 13, 1998)
 "Crown of Thorns" (December 20, 1998)
 "When the Bough Breaks" (December 27, 1998)
 "Love Knots" (January 3, 1999)
 "The Book of Hours" (January 10, 1999)

Season 3 (1999)
 "Ask Me Questions, I'll Tell You No Lies" (September 28, 1999)
 "The Return of Maida Flynn" (September 29, 1999)
 "Under the Wishing Moon" (September 30, 1999)
 "Bridge of Dreams" (October 1, 1999)
 "Bred to the Bone" (October 4, 1999)
 "The Return of Malcolm Murray" (October 5, 1999)
 "In the Valley of the Shadow of Death" (October 6, 1999)
 "The Plague" (October 6, 1999)
 "Had a Wife and Couldn't Keep Her" (October 7, 1999) 
 "A Fall from Grace" (October 8, 1999)
 "The Bequest" (October 11, 1999)
 "Command Performance" (October 12, 1999)
 "A Man May Work from Sun to Sun, But a Woman's Work is Never Done" (October 13, 1999)
 "A Weaver of Dreams" (October 14, 1999)

Season 4 (2000)
 "Rites of Passage" (May 29, 2000)
 "The Taming of Isle Burnley" (May 30, 2000)
 "A Bill of Divorcement" (May 31, 2000)
 "Too Close to the Sun" (June 1, 2000)
 "Weight of the World" (June 4, 2000)
 "Away" (June 5, 2000)
 "A Seller of Dreams" (June 6, 2000)

Home Media releases

United States
Echo Bridge Home Entertainment has released all four seasons on DVD in the United States, as well as a complete series DVD set.

Canada
Alliance Home Entertainment has released all four seasons on DVD in Canada for the very first time.

Streaming

As of 2017, the show has begun streaming for free on Canada Media Fund's Encore+ YouTube page. Unfortunately Encore+ YouTube channel was discontinued in November 2022.

References

External links
 L.M. Montgomery Online This scholarly site includes a blog, a bibliography of reference materials, and a complete filmography of all adaptations of Montgomery texts. See, in particular, the page for Emily of New Moon.
 

 The Official Emily of New Moon Fan Site Includes a synopsis of the series and information on the cast and crew behind the Emily of New Moon television series.

CBC Television original programming
1990s Canadian drama television series
1998 Canadian television series debuts
2000s Canadian drama television series
2000 Canadian television series endings
Television series by Cookie Jar Entertainment
Television shows set in Prince Edward Island
Television shows filmed in Prince Edward Island
Culture of Charlottetown
Summerside, Prince Edward Island
Period family drama television series
English-language television shows
Canadian fantasy television series